The 8th Illinois Cavalry Regiment was a cavalry regiment that served in the Union Army during the American Civil War. The regiment served the duration of the war, and was the only Illinois cavalry regiment to serve the entire war in the Army of the Potomac.  They also aided in the hunt for John Wilkes Booth and served as President Lincoln's honor guard while he lay in state under the rotunda. Lincoln gave them the nickname of "Farnsworth's Abolitionist Regiment" when he watched them march past the White House.

Service
The regiment was commissioned on August 11, 1861, and was assembled for service in St. Charles, Illinois, on September 18, 1861, at the site donated by Colonel Farnsworth called Camp Kane. They were sent out on July 17, 1865, in Chicago, Illinois.

Battle of Gettysburg
During the Gettysburg Campaign, the 8th Illinois Cavalry was in the division of Brig. Gen. John Buford. They deployed west of Gettysburg on June 30, 1863, under the command of Colonel William Gamble, and waited for oncoming Confederates that arrived early the following morning. The first shot of the subsequent battle was fired by Lieutenant Marcellus E. Jones of Company E, who borrowed a carbine from Sergeant Levi Shafer and fired at an unidentified officer on a gray horse over a half-mile away. The 8th, along with the rest of the brigade, performed a fighting withdrawal towards McPherson's Ridge, delaying the Confederate division of Henry Heth for several hours and allowing the Union I Corps to arrive.

Two decades after the war ended, veterans of the regiment dedicated a monument to the 8th Illinois along the crest of  McPherson's Ridge.
Lt. Jones would also erect a monument in recognition of the first shot he fired on the location of the shot next to the Whistler's home just east of Marsh Creek on the Chambersburg Pike. The stone was quarried from Naperville limestone; Naperville was the hometown of Levi Shafer, whose carbine Jones borrowed.

Total strength and casualties
The regiment suffered a total of 250 fatalities; seven officers and 68 enlisted men killed in action or died of their wounds and one officer and 174 enlisted men died of disease.

Commanders
 Colonel John F. Farnsworth - promoted brigadier general on December 5, 1862
 Colonel William Gamble - mustered out with the regiment.
 Major John Lourie Beveridge - commanded at Gettysburg, then promoted to Colonel and commander of the 17th Illinois Cavalry in Nov 1863, was Illinois' Governor from 1873-1877.
 Major William H. Medill - commanded at Antietam and Williamsport before dying from wounds in the latter

Other notables
 Sergeant Horace Capron, Jr. - Medal of Honor recipient; son of Horace Capron
 First Lieutenant Elon J. Farnsworth - promoted in June 1863 to brigadier general as assigned to a brigade command; killed in the Battle of Gettysburg. Nephew of Colonel Farnsworth.
 Captain George Alexander Forsyth, later a famed Indian fighter in the Old West.
 Lieutenant Marcellus Jones, would go on to remove the Dupage County records from Naperville, Illinois and take them to Wheaton, Illinois, where the present county seat is located.
 Private Henry Laycock - later a member of the Wisconsin State Assembly.

See also 
 List of Illinois Civil War Units
 Illinois in the American Civil War

References 
 The Civil War Archive

Notes 

Units and formations of the Union Army from Illinois
1861 establishments in Illinois
Military units and formations established in 1861
Military units and formations disestablished in 1865